Sudeep Sarangi is an Indian actor who acts in Bengali, Hindi, and Tamil-language films and Hindi-language television shows. He is known for his role in Kaadhal Kondein (2003).

Career 
He made his debut with the Tamil-language film Kaadhal Kondein (2003) as the antagonist. After the success of the film, Sudeep starred in Ennavo Pudichirukku (2004) and Kadhale Jayam (2005) in similar roles. These films, however, unlike his first film released to negative reviews.  However, he worked in a business firm after a period of debt when his father became ill and his brother's business wasn't doing well. He was later offered roles in the Hindi television series  Prithviraj Chauhan, Baba Aiso Varr Dhoondo, and Mahadev. He had a brief role in Sahara One's Haunted Nights.

Filmography 
 Films

Television

Plays 
Source
Baghdad Ka Ghulam
 Bhagwat Ajjukyyam

References

External links 

Living people
Indian male film actors
Male actors in Bengali cinema
Male actors in Hindi cinema
Male actors in Tamil cinema
Male actors in Hindi television
Year of birth missing (living people)